Karsten Styrbæk Lauritzen (born 14 October 1983 in Løgstør) is a Danish politician, who is a member of the Folketing for the Venstre political party. He was elected into parliament in the 2007 Danish general election. He served as Minister of Taxation from 2015 to 2019.

Background
Lauritzen was born and raised in Løgstør. His father Jens Lauritzen is a farmer and former mayor of Løgstør Municipality and Vesthimmerland Municipality. Karsten Lauritzen got his high school exam from Fjerritslev Gymnasium and has a bachelor's degree in public administration from Aalborg University.

Political career 
Karsten Lauritzen began his political career as a member of Venstres Ungdom the official youth party for the Liberal Party of Denmark. He later became deputy chairman for Venstres Ungdom from 2003 to 2005 and then chairman from 2005 to 2007. He was elected into the Folketing in the 2007 general election. In the parliament he previously served as both integration and development spokesman as well as legal spokesman for the Venstre party. He was appointed Tax Minister on 28 June 2015, as part of Lars Løkke Rasmussen II Cabinet. He continued in the same position in the Lars Løkke Rasmussen III Cabinet.

References

External links 
 Biography on the website of the Danish Parliament (Folketinget)

1983 births
Living people
People from Vesthimmerland Municipality
Aalborg University alumni
Venstre (Denmark) politicians
Danish Tax Ministers
Government ministers of Denmark
Members of the Folketing 2007–2011
Members of the Folketing 2011–2015
Members of the Folketing 2015–2019
Members of the Folketing 2019–2022